União Foot-Ball Lisboa (Lisbon Union FC in English), was a football club founded in Lisbon, Portugal, on 3 March 1910. In 1942 the club merged with Carcavelinhos Football Clube to form Atlético Clube de Portugal.

References

Football clubs in Portugal
Association football clubs established in 1910
Sport in Lisbon
1910 establishments in Portugal